Hopea dyeri is a tree in the family Dipterocarpaceae. It is named for the British botanist William Turner Thiselton-Dyer.

Description
It has buttresses and stilt roots. The smooth bark may become flaky in patches.

Distribution and habitat
Hopea dyeri is native to Peninsular Malaysia and Borneo.

References

dyeri
Flora of Peninsular Malaysia
Flora of Borneo
Plants described in 1891